Steffani Anne Brass Vaughn (born February 16, 1992) is an American actress.

Brass was born in Woodland Hills, California. She is the youngest of four children; she has two older sisters and an older brother. She also has a nephew.

Brass started acting during her early years, appearing in an advert for Pampers diapers at six months old. Since then, she has starred in over 50 national commercials and print ads combined. Brass's first appearance on television  was as a little girl named Kelly on an episode of The Amanda Show when she was seven years old. She starred in an episode of The Amanda Show again two years later, playing Becky. Brass has appeared on Everybody Loves Raymond, ER, Malcolm in the Middle, Friends and That 70's Show, amongst other TV programs. She has also starred in several films, with the last one being Target in 2004. From May 2006 to May 2007 she starred in her own web show, GirlTalkTV, with fellow actress Abigail Mavity.

Personal life
She has two older sisters named Tammi and Amanda, a brother named Bryan, and a nephew named Kevin.

She is close friends with Spencer Locke, Dyllan Christopher and Abigail Mavity.

She is 5' 2" (1.57 m).

Filmography

References

External links 

 

1992 births
American child actresses
American television actresses
Living people
Actresses from Los Angeles
People from Woodland Hills, Los Angeles
20th-century American actresses
21st-century American actresses